Qandar Qalu (also Romanized as Qandar Qālū and Qanderqālū; also known as Kardinkali, Qandarqālī, and Qandirqāli) is a village in Qareh Poshtelu-e Pain Rural District, Qareh Poshtelu District, Zanjan County, Zanjan Province, Iran. At the 2006 census, its population was 258, with 52 families.

References 

Populated places in Zanjan County